The Kei rock gecko (Nactus undulatus) is a species of lizard in the family Gekkonidae. It is found in Indonesia.

References

Nactus
Reptiles of Indonesia
Reptiles described in 1926